Ahmed Fatimah Bisola is the current Commissioner for Education and Human Capital Development, Kwara State.

Early life and education 
Fatimah Ahmed obtained her teaching licence from Teachers Registration Council of Nigeria as a certified professional teacher. As commissioner for Education in Kwara, she disclose the use of Information and communications technology in Kwara State to transform education sector. she obtained her teaching licence from Teacher's Registration Council of Nigeria.

Career 
In her career she set a schedule on writing common entrance for primary students. she disclose that no any school should collect school fees for third term in Kwara State. also she warned private secondary schools to take precaution against COVID-19. she warned parents not to let their children in any kind of bad behaviour as students.

References

External links  
 Official website Kwara State Government

Living people
Nigerian women in politics
People from Kwara State
Year of birth missing (living people)